Above Rubies is a 1932 British comedy film directed by Frank Richardson and starring Zoe Palmer, Robin Irvine and Tom Helmore. It is set in Monte Carlo.

It was made at Walton Studios as a quota quickie for release by United Artists.

Cast
 Zoe Palmer as Joan Wellingford 
 Robin Irvine as Philip 
 Tom Helmore as Paul 
 John Deverell as Lord Middlehurst 
 Franklyn Bellamy as Dupont 
 Allan Jeayes as Lamont 
 Madge Snell as Lady Wellingford

References

Bibliography
 Chibnall, Steve. Quota Quickies: The Birth of the British 'B' Film. British Film Institute, 2007.
 Low, Rachael. Filmmaking in 1930s Britain. George Allen & Unwin, 1985.
 Wood, Linda. British Films, 1927-1939. British Film Institute, 1986.

External links

1932 films
British comedy films
1932 comedy films
Films shot at Nettlefold Studios
United Artists films
Quota quickies
Films directed by Frank Richardson
Films set in Monaco
British black-and-white films
1930s English-language films
1930s British films
English-language comedy films